Emanuel Abraham Schegloff (born 1937 in New York) is a Distinguished Professor of Sociology at the University of California at Los Angeles. Along with his collaborators Harvey Sacks and Gail Jefferson, Schegloff is regarded as the creator of the field of Conversation Analysis.

Life 

Schegloff studied journalism at the Hebrew Teacher's College from 1953 to 1957 and was awarded a Bachelor of Journalism at the end of his studies there.

References
Ochs, Elinor, Emanuel Schegloff and Sandra Thompson. (1996) Interaction and Grammar. Cambridge University Press. 
Harvey Sacks, Emanuel A. Schegloff, Gail Jefferson. "A Simplest Systematics for the Organization of Turn-Taking for Conversation." Language, Vol. 50, No. 4, Part 1 (Dec., 1974), pp. 696–735
Schegloff, Emanuel A. (2006). Sequence organization in interaction: A primer in conversation analysis. Cambridge: Cambridge University Press.

External links
 Vita at the UCLA site
 Schegloff publications archive

Linguists from the United States
University of California, Los Angeles faculty
1937 births
Living people
American sociologists